Gymnothorax phasmatodes, the ghost moray, or ghost moray eel, is a moray eel found in the western Indian Ocean.

References

phasmatodes
Fish described in 1962